Dean v. United States, 556 U.S. 568 (2009), was a decision by the United States Supreme Court upholding a 10-year penalty for the discharge of a firearm during the commission of any violent or drug trafficking crime, against a bank robber whose gun went off accidentally.

Background 
In 2004, a bank robber, Christopher M. Dean entered a branch of AmSouth Bank in Rome, Georgia wearing a mask and waving a gun. He instructed everyone to get down, walked behind the teller counter, and took cash from the teller station with his left hand while holding his gun with his right. The gun discharged, leaving a bullet hole in the partition between two stations. Dean cursed and ran out of the bank. Witnesses later testified that he seemed surprised that the gun had gone off. No one was hurt.

Dean and an accomplice were later caught and charged with conspiracy to commit a robbery affecting interstate commerce, in violation of 18 U.S.C. §1951(a), and aiding and abetting each other in using, carrying, possessing, and discharging a firearm during an armed robbery, in violation of §924(c)(1)(A)(iii) and §2. Dean admitted to committing the robbery and was convicted by a jury of the robbery and firearm counts.

Under 18 U.S.C. § 924(c)(1)(A)(iii), an individual convicted for using or carrying a firearm during and in relation to any violent or drug trafficking crime, or possessing a fire-arm in furtherance of such a crime, receives a 10-year mandatory minimum sentence, in addition to the punishment for the underlying crime "if the firearm is discharged."

Dean was sentenced to 10 years in prison. He appealed, contending that the discharge was accidental, and that the sentencing enhancement in §924(c)(1)(A)(iii) requires proof that the defendant intended to discharge the firearm.  Deans conviction was affirmed by the Court of Appeals for the Eleventh Circuit and the Supreme Court of the United States granted certiorari to resolve a conflict in the circuits.

Decision 
In a 7 to 2 decision delivered by Justice Roberts, the Supreme Court held that Section 924(c)(1)(A)(iii) required no separate proof of intent. Justice Stevens and Justice Breyer filed dissenting opinions.

External links

 
 Court Upholds 10-Year Penalty for Robber’s Flub (NYT)

United States Supreme Court cases
2009 in United States case law
Bank robbery
United States Supreme Court cases of the Roberts Court
United States Supreme Court criminal cases
United States federal firearms case law